Heinrich Reif-Gintl (7 October 1900, in Vienna – 13 July 1974, in Vienna) was an Austrian opera manager and theatre director.

Reif-Gintl began his career in theater administration in 1923. He directed the Vienna Staatsoper for four years, beginning in 1968.

References 
 
 

Austrian theatre directors
Opera managers
Theatre people from Vienna
1900 births
1974 deaths